Aakrosh may refer to:

 Aakrosh (1980 film), Govind Nihalani film
 Aakrosh (1998 film), Latif Binny film
 Aakrosh (2010 film), Priyadarshan film
 Aakrosham, a 1982 Malayalam-language film